Gerald Bernard Huth (July 23, 1933 – February 11, 2011) was an American football guard who played in the National Football League (NFL) for the New York Giants, the Philadelphia Eagles and the Minnesota Vikings. He played college football at Wake Forest University and was drafted in the 24th round of the 1956 NFL Draft. Postmortem research diagnosed Huth with chronic traumatic encephalopathy.

References

1933 births
2011 deaths
American football offensive guards
American football players with chronic traumatic encephalopathy
Wake Forest Demon Deacons football players
New York Giants players
Philadelphia Eagles players
Minnesota Vikings players
People from Floyd County, Indiana
Players of American football from Indiana